Live and Improvised is a two compact disc live album by the band Blood, Sweat & Tears, that was originally released in 1976 as a live album entitled In Concert by Columbia Records in Europe and Japan. This album was later remixed and released in the United States as Live and Improvised in 1991 by Columbia/Legacy and again as "In Concert" in 2012 by Wounded Bird, with a different cover. This collection was recorded live at four different venues over five nights during the summer of 1975. The lineup for this album is the same as the New City album they were supporting on that tour with the exception of Steve Khan and Mike Stern on guitar.

The songs in this collection were recorded at the Schaeffer Music Festival in New York City; City Hall Plaza in Boston; National Arts Centre in Ottawa, Ontario; and at the Monterey Jazz Festival in Monterey, California.

Reception

Writing for Allmusic, critic Bruce Eder wrote, "What's also lacking is some excitement -- in the group's evident desire to emphasize their jazz side while minimizing any rock elements in their playing, they've also banished any tension, or the interplay between rock and jazz elements upon which their original appeal was founded. Numbers like "Spinning Wheel," "Lucretia MacEvil," "And When I Die," and "I Love You More Than You'll Ever Know" are done in such loose-limbed fashion that, apart from showcasing some virtuoso playing and Clayton-Thomas' more oppressive mannerisms, they're rather weak reinterpretations... On the positive side, along with the presence of those arrangements, the playing is very good, if not always terribly involving, and in those moments when Clayton-Thomas keeps his instincts in check, the material does recapture and expand on the best components of the original group's sound."

Track listing
Disc One 
"Spinning Wheel" (David Clayton-Thomas) – 6:02
"I Love You More Than You'll Ever Know" (Al Kooper) – 8:54
"Lucretia Mac Evil" (David Clayton-Thomas) – 7:08
"And When I Die" (Laura Nyro) – 2:10
"One Room Country Shack" (John Lee Hooker) – 6:57
"And When I Die (Reprise)" (Laura Nyro) – 3:07
"(I Can Recall) Spain" (Chick Corea) – 9:01

Disc Two 
"Hi-De-Ho" (Gerry Goffin, Carole King) – 6:33
"Unit Seven" (Sam Jones) – 11:07
"Life" (Allen Toussaint) – 5:15
"Mean Ole World" (Jerry LaCroix) – 9:39
"Ride Captain Ride" (Carlos Pinera, Franke Konte) – 6:59
"You've Made Me So Very Happy" (Berry Gordy Jr., Brenda Holloway, Frank Wilson, Patrice Holloway) – 6:06

Personnel
David Clayton-Thomas – lead vocals
Bobby Colomby - drums, backing vocals
Dave Bargeron - trombone, tuba, percussion, backing vocals
Larry Willis – keyboards, backing vocals
Bill Tillman – saxophone, flute, backing vocals
Anthony Klatka - trumpet, backing vocals
Joe Giorgianni – trumpet, backing vocals
Steve Khan - guitar, backing vocals at Schaeffer Music Festival; City Hall Plaza
Georg Wadenius – guitar, backing vocals at the National Arts Centre
Mike Stern - guitar, backing vocals at Monterey Jazz Festival
Ron McClure – bass
Don Alias - percussion, Backing vocals

Production notes
Jimmy Ienner – Executive Producer
Bobby Colomby – Producer
Recorded at the following locations:
July 5, 1975 – Schaeffer Music Festival in New York City
July 20, 1975 – City Hall Plaza in Boston
August 11, 12, 1975 – National Arts Centre in Ottawa, Ontario
September 21, 1975 – Monterey Jazz Festival in Monterey, California

Digitally remastered by Mark Wilder at Sony Music Studios, New York

References 

Blood, Sweat & Tears albums
1991 live albums
Columbia Records live albums
Albums produced by Bobby Colomby
Albums produced by Jimmy Ienner
albums recorded at the Monterey Jazz Festival